Ludwig Wahrmund (21 August 1860 – 10 September 1932) was an Austrian professor of Canon Law at the University of Innsbruck.

Ludwig was the son of Adolf Wahrmund, a noted anti-semite. However, Ludwig rose to prominence from a lecture he gave on 18 January 1908 in Innsbruck Town Hall entitled Catholic Weltanschauung and Free Science. The lecture was repeated in Salzburg and published as a pamphlet. Ludwig's criticism of the Catholic Church and their attempt to control education gave rise to the "Wahrmund Affair", which led to his removal from his professorial chair in Innsbruck.

References

External links
 

1860 births
1932 deaths
Academic staff of the University of Innsbruck